The Flying Dutchman is a legendary ghost ship.

Flying Dutchman may also refer to:

Arts and entertainment

Films
 The Flying Dutchman (1923 film), a silent American film
 The Flying Dutchman (1925 film), a Swedish silent film
 Pandora and the Flying Dutchman (1951 film), a British drama film
 The Flying Dutchman (1957 film), a Dutch biographical film
 The Flying Dutchman (1995 film), a Dutch comedy
 The Flying Dutchman (2000 film), an American murder thriller

Music
 The Flying Dutchman, English translation of the title of Der fliegende Holländer, an 1843 opera based on the legend, by Richard Wagner
 Flying Dutchman Records, a jazz record label
 The Flying Dutchman, a 2005 album by André Rieu
 "Flying Dutchman", a song from Jethro Tull's 1979 album Stormwatch 
 "Flying Dutchman", a 1992 song by Tori Amos, B-side to China

Other arts and entertainment
 The Flying Dutchman (novel), by Michael Arlen
 Flying Dutchman (SpongeBob SquarePants), a character in the animated TV series SpongeBob SquarePants
 Flying Dutchman (Efteling), a roller coaster in the Efteling amusement park, Netherlands

People
 The Flying Dutchman (nickname), a list of people

School sports
 Hofstra University in Hempstead, Long Island, New York, United States, until 2004
 Hope College in Holland, Michigan, United States
 Lebanon Valley College in Annville, Pennsylvania, United States
 Guilderland High School in Guilderland Center, New York, United States

Transportation
 Flying Dutchman (train), a Great Western Railway (GWR) express passenger train service that ran from 1849 until 1892
 Flying Dutchman, a GWR 3031 Class steam locomotive, built in 1892 and withdrawn from service in 1912
 Flying Dutchman Funicular, an inclined railway at Cape Point, Cape of Good Hope, South Africa
 Flying Dutchman (sternwheeler), a 19th-century Canadian trading vessel
 Flying Dutchman (horse-powered locomotive), operated by the South Carolina Canal and Railroad Company in 1830

Other uses
 90377 Sedna, a trans-Neptunian object discovered in 2003
 Flying Dutchman (dinghy), a high-performance racing sailboat class
 The Flying Dutchman (horse) (1846–1870), English thoroughbred racehorse and sire
 Flying Dutchman (pigeon), a pigeon who received the Dickin Medal in 1945
 Flying Dutchman (tobacco), for pipes distributed by Royal Theodorus Niemeyer Ltd., a Dutch company
 Flying Dutchman, name given to a drift bottle that traveled 16,000 miles (1929–1935)
 Flying Dutchman, KLM frequent flyer program, now merged into the Flying Blue program
 the Flying Dutchmen, an 1868 football team from London
 Flying Dutchman, an off-menu hamburger variation sold at the In-n-Out Burger chain

See also
 Dennis Bergkamp (born 1969), aerophobic Dutch footballer nicknamed the "Non-Flying Dutchman"
 Flying Dutch, 1991 fantasy novel by British author Tom Holt
 The Flying Dutch, an electronic music festival held in Amsterdam, Rotterdam and Eindhoven
 Frying Dutchman (disambiguation)